Alexander James Watson (born 12 July 1979) is a British historian. He is the author of three books, which focus on East-Central Europe, Germany and Britain during World War I. His most recent book, The Fortress: The Great Siege of Przemysl was praised by The Times newspaper as a "masterpiece".  His previous book, Ring of Steel: Germany and Austria-Hungary at War, 1914-1918, won numerous awards. Currently Watson is Professor of History at Goldsmiths, University of London.

Education
In 2000, Watson received his Bachelor of Arts (hons) degree in Modern history from Exeter College, Oxford. He began his doctoral degree in 2001 at Balliol College, Oxford, and completed in 2005.
From 2005 to 2008, he was a Clare Hall, Cambridge Research Fellow. For three years, starting in 2008, Watson was a British Academy Postdoctoral Fellow at the University of Cambridge. In 2010, he was a College Research Associate at St. John's College, Cambridge. Watson was a Marie Curie Intra-European Fellow at the University of Warsaw in Poland from 2011 to 2013.

Career
Watson's first book, Enduring the Great War; Combat, Morale and Collapse in the German armies (1914–1918), began as his doctoral thesis in October 2001. It was published by Cambridge University Press in 2008. The book focuses on the psyche of German and British soldiers in World War I and attempts to understand how they were able to fight for all those years. In 2006, it was awarded the Fraenkel Prize from the Institute of Contemporary History and Wiener Library.

In August 2014, Watson's second book, Ring of Steel: Germany and Austria-Hungary at War (1914–1918) was published. To write the book, he spent two years researching archives in Poland, Germany, and Austria. His reason for writing the book was to better understand the war from the perspective of the Central Powers' leaders and their peoples; how they were able to endure suffering and commit crimes that would later lead to "even greater horrors of totalitarian dictatorship, a second world war and genocide". The book received many accolades. It was awarded The Sunday Times 2014 History Book of the Year, the 2015 Distinguished Book Award from the Society for Military History, and the 2015 British Army Military Book of the Year. On 23 March 2015 Watson was awarded the second annual 2014 Guggenheim-Lehrman Prize in Military History, and received $50,000. The award is given to the best book in the field of military history published during the previous calendar year. During a ceremony on 14 May 2015, Watson received the Wolfson History Prize for Ring of Steel. Along with this prize, Watson was also awarded £25,000.

The Fortress: The Great Siege of Przemysl, Watson's most recent book, was released in October 2019.  This is the story of the First World War's longest siege, and of the opening of the brutal tragedy which befell East-Central Europe during the twentieth century.  It follows a Habsburg garrison of old soldiers defending the city from Russian attack, and recounts the fighting, starvation and anti-Semitic ethnic cleansing which began in the region already in 1914.

Watson has written for The New York Times, Times Higher Education, and History Today. He has been interviewed for BBC Radio programs, "World War One" and "Good Morning, Scotland", and appeared on the German Channel's documentary, "The Search for the Lost Sons. One Hundred Years of the First World War".

Publications
Books
The Fortress: The Great Siege of Przemysl, 2019, 
Ring of Steel: Germany and Austria-Hungary at War, 1914–1918, 2014, 
Enduring the Great War. Combat, Morale and Collapse in the German and British armies, 1914–1918, 2008, 

Articles
"Managing an 'Army of Peoples': Identity, Command and Performance in the Habsburg Officer Corps, 1914-1918", Contemporary European History, 2016, ISSN 0960-7773 
"'Unheard of Brutality': Russian Atrocities against Civilians in East Prussia, 1914–1915", The Journal of Modern History, 2014, ISSN 0022-2801
"Fighting for Another Fatherland: the Polish Minority in the German Army, 1914–1918", The English Historical Review, 2011, ISSN 0013-8266
"Bereaved and Aggrieved: Combat Motivation and the Ideology of Sacrifice in the First World War", Historical Research, 2010, ISSN 1468-2281
"Culture and Combat in the Western World, 1900–1945", The Historical Journal, 2008, ISSN 0018-246X
"Junior Officership in the German Army during the Great War, 1914–1918", War in History, 2007, ISSN 0968-3445
"Self-Deception and Survival: Mental Coping Strategies on the Western Front, 1914–1918", Journal of Contemporary History, 2006, ISSN 0022-0094
"For Kaiser and Reich": the Identity and Fate of the German Volunteers, 1914–1918", War in History, 2005, ISSN 0968-3445

References

External links
Wolfson History Prize special podcast
Alexander Watson interview at Iowa Research Online

1979 births
Living people
British military historians
British male writers
Alumni of Exeter College, Oxford
Alumni of Balliol College, Oxford
Academics of Goldsmiths, University of London
Historians of World War I
21st-century British historians